Alpenexpress Enzian (formerly Grottenblitz) is a powered roller coaster with optional virtual reality manufactured by Mack Rides and located at Europa-Park in Rust, Germany. It is located in the Austria section of the park, and was built in 1984. Alpenexpress was the first roller coaster built at the park.

Specifications 

The Alpenexpress train has 10 cars which can accommodate 38 people (four per car, two per row). Each car is equipped with an electric motor which draws power from rails situated between the tracks. The motors drive wheels which run on a third rail in the center of the tracks. It has a capacity of 1100 people per hour and a ride time of 1 minute 40 seconds.

Virtual Reality  

Alpenexpress Coastiality is an optional, pay-per-ride virtual reality experience on Alpenexpress. The system was developed by Mack Rides and VR Coaster and was introduced in September 2015. Each ride at opening cost an extra €2 per person. Riders wear wireless Samsung Gear VR headsets with a selection of four experiences.

Layout 

Initially the ride turns sharply right, then into a left-hand helix into the "Magic World of Diamonds", an artificial cave with a mine theme - this cave is shared with the Tirol Log Flume ride. The ride takes a sharp turn to the right out of the cave and back into the station. Normally the ride operates for two laps.

References

External links

Roller coasters in Germany
Roller coasters introduced in 1984
Rides at Europa-Park